Charles Spain Verral (November 7, 1904 – April 1, 1990) was a writer and illustrator born in Ontario, Canada. He wrote Street & Smith's Bill Barnes pulp series novels, among others. Among the most widely read of his books are the Brains Benton Mysteries, a six-book series published from 1959 to 1961.  He also published many other children's works, including Lassie, Rin Tin Tin, and Popeye.

Some of Verral's Other Works 
 Captain of the Ice, 1955
 Annie Oakley Sharpshooter, 1956
 Lassie and the Daring Rescue, 1956
 Rin Tin Tin and the Outlaw, 1957
 The Lone Ranger and Tonto, 1957
 Rin Tin Tin and the Hidden Treasure, 1958
 Lassie and Her Day in the Sun, 1958
 JETS, 1971
 Babe Ruth, Sultan of Swat, 1976
 Popeye Climbs a Mountain, 1980
 Popeye and the Haunted House, 1980
 Popeye Goes Fishing, 1983

References 
NY Times Obituary

1904 births
1990 deaths
Canadian children's writers